The VIII Bolivarian Games (Spanish: Juegos Bolivarianos) were a multi-sport event held between October 15–29, 1977, at the Estadio Olímpico La Paz in La Paz, Bolivia. The Games were organized by the Bolivarian Sports Organization (ODEBO).

The Games were officially opened by Bolivian president, General Hugo Banzer.  Torch lighter was Athlete Julia Iriarte, who won five gold and three silver medals in the eight events at the 1947-48 Bolivarian Games.

The stadium in La Paz was one of the first in South America equipped with a
synthetic track for the athletics running events.  Because the stadium is
situated 3,650 metres above sea level, and this about the first time that a
big international sports event of that size took place at this altitude, there
was a substantial medical interest in its influence on both the performance
and the health of the athletes.

A detailed history of the early editions of the Bolivarian Games between 1938 and 1989 was published in a book written (in Spanish) by José Gamarra Zorrilla, former president of the Bolivian Olympic Committee, and first president (1976-1982) of ODESUR.  Gold medal winners from Ecuador were published by the Comité Olímpico Ecuatoriano.

Participation 
Athletes from 6 countries were reported to participate:

 Panama
 Peru

Sports 
The following 16 sports were explicitly mentioned:

Aquatic sports 
 Diving
 Swimming
 Water polo
 Athletics
 Basketball
 Bowling
 Boxing
Cycling 
 Road cycling
 Track cycling
 Equestrian
 Fencing
 Football
 Gymnastics (artistic)
 Judo
 Shooting
 Tennis
 Volleyball
 Weightlifting
 Wrestling

Medal count
The medal count for these Games is tabulated below.  A slightly different number of medals was published elsewhere. This table is sorted by the number of gold medals earned by each country.  The number of silver medals is taken into consideration next, and then the number of bronze medals.

References 

Bolivarian Games
Bolivarian Games
B
Bolivar
20th century in La Paz
Sports competitions in La Paz
1977 in multi-sport events
October 1977 sports events in South America